John Robert Dixon (April 2, 1899 – February 3, 1985) was an American baseball pitcher in the Negro leagues. He played from 1926 to 1934 with several clubs.

References

External links
 and Baseball-Reference Black Baseball stats and Seamheads

St. Louis Stars (baseball) players
Detroit Stars players
Cleveland Hornets players
Cleveland Tigers (baseball) players
Cuban House of David players
Cleveland Red Sox players
Pollock's Cuban Stars players
1899 births
1985 deaths
20th-century African-American sportspeople
Baseball pitchers